Lake Roesiger is a census-designated place (CDP) in Snohomish County, Washington, United States. The population was 503 at the 2010 census.

Based on per capita income, one of the more reliable measures of affluence, Lake Roesiger ranks 98th of 522 areas in the state of Washington to be ranked.

Geography
Lake Roesiger is located at  (47.981018, -121.919839).

According to the United States Census Bureau, the CDP has a total area of 10.1 square miles (26.2 km2), of which, 9.6 square miles (24.8 km2) of it is land and 0.5 square miles (1.4 km2) of it (5.25%) is water.

Demographics
As of the census of 2000, there were 652 people, 239 households, and 182 families residing in the CDP. The population density was 68.1 people per square mile (26.3/km2). There were 433 housing units at an average density of 45.2/sq mi (17.5/km2). The racial makeup of the CDP was 95.55% White, 0.46% African American, 0.92% Native American, 0.61% Asian, 0.46% from other races, and 1.99% from two or more races. Hispanic or Latino of any race were 1.53% of the population.

There were 239 households, out of which 34.3% had children under the age of 18 living with them, 67.4% were married couples living together, 4.2% had a female householder with no husband present, and 23.8% were non-families. 15.5% of all households were made up of individuals, and 2.9% had someone living alone who was 65 years of age or older. The average household size was 2.73 and the average family size was 3.04.

In the CDP, the age distribution of the population shows 24.7% under the age of 18, 9.7% from 18 to 24, 29.6% from 25 to 44, 27.5% from 45 to 64, and 8.6% who were 65 years of age or older. The median age was 39 years. For every 100 females, there were 113.8 males. For every 100 females age 18 and over, there were 115.4 males.

The median income for a household in the CDP was $70,500, and the median income for a family was $72,375. Males had a median income of $45,313 versus $36,200 for females. The per capita income for the CDP was $24,390. None of the families and 2.4% of the population were living below the poverty line, including no under eighteens and 5.1% of those over 64.

References

Census-designated places in Snohomish County, Washington
Census-designated places in Washington (state)